Elections are held in Syracuse, New York to election the city's mayor. Currently, these elections are regularly scheduled to be held once every four years, with the elections taking place in the off-year immediately after United States presidential election years.

Elections before 2009

2009 

The 2009 Syracuse mayoral election was held on November 3, 2009. The incumbent mayor, Democrat Matt Driscoll, was term limited. Democrat Stephanie Miner defeated Republican Steve Kimatian, 50%-39%, and Conservative Party of New York candidate Otis Jennings finished a distant 3rd, with 10% of the vote. Miner became the city's first female leader.

Democratic primary

Candidates 
Alfonso Davis – Democratic political consultant
Carmen Harlow – former Syracuse Department of Public Works deputy commissioner
Stephanie Miner, Syracuse Common Councilor-at-Large
Joe Nicoletti – business development consultant, former New York State Assemblyman and Syracuse Common Councilor

Withdrew 
Bethaida González, Syracuse Common Council President. Dropped out of race prior to primary.

Results

Republican primary

Candidates 
Otis Jennings
Steve Kimatian, former general counsel to Newport Television, former regional vice-president of Clear Channel Television, former television personality with Syracuse ABC-affiliate WSYR-TV

Results 
Steve Kiatian defeated Otis Jennings. Jennings had carried the endorsement of the local Republican Party organization.

Conservative nomination 
Otis Jennings, after receiving an overwhelming endorsement from the Syracuse Republican Party, Jennings lost in the September primary for the Republican nomination. Days after the primary, he decided to continue campaigning, and received the nomination from the Conservative Party of New York.

General election 
The general election took place on November 3, 2009.

2013 

The 2013 Syracuse mayoral election was held on November 5, 2013, in Syracuse, New York. The incumbent mayor, Democrat Stephanie Miner, ran for re-election. She defeated Conservative candidate Ian Hunter and Green Party candidate Kevin Bott, winning 68% of the vote. The Republican Party did not field a candidate in this election, the first time in over a century that a Syracuse mayor ran unopposed by a major party candidate.

Democratic primary

Candidates 
Stephanie Miner – incumbent mayor
Alfonso Davis – political consultant and candidate in the 2009 mayoral election
Patrick Hogan – member of the Common Council

Results

Other nominations

Conservative 
Ian Hunter – project manager

Hunter collected signatures to run on the Republican line but was kept off of the ballot by the efforts of the Onondaga Republican Party chairman.

Green 
Kevin Bott – non-profit director

General election results 
The general election took place on November 5, 2013.

2017 

The 2017 mayoral election in Syracuse, New York was held on November 7, 2017, and resulted in the election of Ben Walsh, an independent, to his first term as mayor.

Background 
Incumbent mayor Stephanie Miner, a member of the Democratic Party, was first elected in 2009 and was re-elected in 2013, but was term limited in 2017. Syracuse last elected a Republican Party mayor in 1997, and in the 2013 election Republicans did not field a candidate.

Democratic primary

General election 
Five candidates appeared on the general election ballot: Green Party nominee Howie Hawkins, who had run for office 20 times since 1991; Democratic Party nominee Juanita Perez Williams, the city's former corporation counsel; Independence Party, Reform Party and Upstate Jobs Party nominee Ben Walsh, a business development director and the son of U.S. Representative James T. Walsh; Republican nominee Laura Lavine, a former Lafayette School District superintendent; and Working Families Party nominee Joe Nicoletti, who remained on the Working Families party line after unsuccessfully seeking the Democratic nomination and did not campaign. City auditor Martin Masterpole also sought the Democratic nomination.

2021 

The Syracuse mayoral election of 2021 was  held November 2, 2021. Incumbent Independent mayor Ben Walsh was seeking re-election to a second term in office. The local committees of the Democratic, Republican, Conservative, and Working Families parties each endorsed a candidate, however the candidates who did not receive their party's endorsement could force a primary if they wished.

Background 
In 2017, incumbent Democratic mayor Stephanie Miner was term limited and could not seek reelection. Ben Walsh won the race to succeed her, defeating Democrat Juanita Perez Williams. Walsh comes from a family of Republican politicians. He is the son of Jim Walsh, former U.S. Representative from New York's 25th congressional district, and the grandson of William Walsh, former U.S. representative from New York's 33rd congressional district and former Mayor of Syracuse. However, Walsh himself is registered as an Independent, and was the first Independent elected mayor of Syracuse in 104 years. Walsh ran on three ballot lines: Independence, Reform, and a new line that he created for himself, Upstate Jobs. When Walsh confirmed that he would seek re-election, he did not clarify which lines he would campaign under.

Whichever lines he pursues, he will face an uphill battle to get on the ballot, due to several developments since 2017. First, the Reform Party lost automatic ballot access in 2018 after failing to surpass 50,000 votes in that year's gubernatorial election. Then in November 2020, New York increased the cutoff for automatic ballot access. Previously, political parties only needed to gain at least 50,000 votes on their ballot line in a statewide election every four years in order to maintain automatic ballot access. But under the new rules, parties must at least gain either 130,000 votes or 2% of the total, whichever is higher. In addition, they must meet this threshold every two years. As a result of the increased restrictions, the Independence Party also lost its automatic ballot access after the 2020 presidential election. Parties who fail to meet the requirement can still get on the ballot via petition, but this is significantly more difficult, especially for minor parties.

Walsh sought the endorsement of the Working Families Party, one of four parties that surpassed the threshold for automatic ballot access in the 2020 presidential election (the other three are the Democratic Party, the Republican Party, and the Conservative Party), but did not receive it. He has received the nomination of the Independence Party, but will need to collect 1,500 signatures in order to ensure that the Independence line will be on the 2021 ballot. If Walsh cannot collect enough signatures to qualify the Independence Party for the ballot, he will need to run a write-in campaign. On May 25, 2021, Walsh submitted 2,538 signatures to create a dedicated party ballot line.

Democratic primary 
The Onondaga County Democratic Committee endorsed Greene on February 17, 2021. 58% of the committee's members voted for Greene, while 42% voted for Bey. However, Bey chose to continue his candidacy and force a primary. In order to qualify for the primary ballot on June 22, Bey and Greene must collect 300 signatures from registered Democrats.

Candidates

Declared 
Khalid Bey, President pro tempore of the Syracuse common council
Michael Greene, at-large common councilor (endorsed by committee)

Declined 
Yusuf Abdul-Qadir, director of the New York Civil Liberties Union
Latoya Allen, common councillor (endorsed Bey)
Patrick Hogan, common councillor (endorsed Bey)
Marty Masterpole, Onondaga County Comptroller, former Syracuse City Auditor, and candidate for mayor in 2017
Tim Rudd, director of the Syracuse Office of Management and Budget and former at-large common councillor

Fundraising

Results

Republican primary 
The Syracuse Republican Committee endorsed Burman as its mayoral candidate on January 21. However, despite receiving her party's endorsement, Burman did not officially declare her candidacy until March 10. Babilon entered the race on March 1, declaring his intent to force a primary against Burman. The primary will be held on June 22.

Candidates

Declared 
Thomas Babilon, attorney, former member of the Syracuse corporation counsel, and Libertarian candidate for the Syracuse common council in 2019
Janet Burman, economist, former chair of the Syracuse Republican Committee and the Onondaga County Republican Party, and nominee for District 53 of the New York Senate in 2018 (endorsed by committee)

Declined 
Ben Walsh, incumbent mayor

Fundraising

Results

Conservative endorsement 
The Conservative Party endorsed Burman as its mayoral candidate.

Endorsed candidate 
Janet Burman, economist, former chair of the Syracuse Republican Committee and the Onondaga County Republican Party, and nominee for District 53 of the New York Senate in 2018

Nominees/endorsements of parties without automatic ballot access

Independence Party 
The Independence Party endorsed Walsh as its mayoral candidate on February 24. Because the party lost automatic ballot access in the 2020 presidential election, Walsh needed to collect 1,500 signatures in order to create an Independence line on the 2021 ballot. On May 25, 2021, Walsh submitted 2,538 signatures to create a dedicated party ballot line.

Endorsed candidate 
Ben Walsh, incumbent mayor

Working Families endorsement 
The Syracuse Working Families Committee chose not to endorse any candidate in the mayoral election, meaning that its ballot line would go unfilled.

Endorsed candidate 
None

Not endorsed 
Khalid Bey, President pro tempore of the Syracuse common council
Michael Greene, at-large common councillor
Ben Walsh, incumbent mayor

General election

Fundraising

Results

Campaign websites 
 Michael Greene (D) for Mayor
 Ben Walsh (I) for Mayor

Notes

References